Keith David Williams (born March 30, 1965), is an American former professional basketball player. He played college basketball at the University of North Carolina at Charlotte. At 6'0" (1.83 m) tall, he played at the point guard position.

College career
Williams played college basketball at the University of North Carolina at Charlotte, with the Charlotte 49ers, from 1983 to 1987. During his 4 year college career, he averaged 11.4 points, 4.7 assists, and 2.2 steals per game.

Professional career
Williams scored 42 points in a Dutch League game, on December 16, 1987. He was the Dutch League Top Scorer in 1988. He was a four time Polish League champion (1992, 1993, 1994, 1995). He was the Polish League Player of the Year in 1994. In the 1995–96 season, he scored 50 points in a Polish League game.

References

External links
 FIBA EuroLeague Profile
 Eurobasket.com Profile
 Sports-Reference College Profile

1965 births
Living people
American expatriate basketball people in the Netherlands
American expatriate basketball people in Poland
American men's basketball players
Basketball players from New York (state)
BSW (basketball club) players
Charlotte 49ers men's basketball players
KK Włocławek players
Lech Poznań (basketball) players
MKS Znicz Basket Pruszków players
Point guards
Śląsk Wrocław basketball players
Spójnia Stargard players
VBC Akrides players